Andrei Andreyevich Zorin (born 4 May 1997) is a Russian football player plays for FC Alay in the Kyrgyz Premier League.

Club career
He made his debut in the Russian Football National League for FC Baikal Irkutsk on 12 March 2016 in a game against FC Yenisey Krasnoyarsk.

He made his Russian Premier League debut for FC Tom Tomsk on 21 May 2017 in a game against FC Krasnodar.

In 2020, Zorin joined Leader-Champion Issyk-Kul in Kyrgyzstan.

On 4 June 2021, FC Van announced that Zorin had left the club.

References

External links
 Profile by Russian Football National League

1997 births
People from Angarsk
Living people
Russian footballers
Russian expatriate footballers
Association football midfielders
PFC CSKA Moscow players
FC Tom Tomsk players
FC Saturn Ramenskoye players
FC Krasnodar players
FC Baikal Irkutsk players
Russian Premier League players
Armenian First League players
Russian expatriate sportspeople in Armenia
Expatriate footballers in Armenia
Expatriate footballers in Kyrgyzstan
Sportspeople from Irkutsk Oblast